Wiggle stereoscopy is an example of stereoscopy in which left and right images of a stereogram are animated. This technique is also called wiggle 3-D, wobble 3-D, or sometimes Piku-Piku (Japanese for "twitching").

The sense of depth from such images is due to parallax and to changes to the occlusion of background objects. In contrast to other stereo display techniques, the same image is presented to both eyes.

Advantages and disadvantages
Wiggle stereoscopy offers the advantages that no glasses or special hardware is required; most people can perceive the effect more quickly than when using cross-eyed and parallel viewing techniques. Furthermore, it offers stereo-like depth to people with limited or no vision in one eye.

Disadvantages of wiggle stereoscopy are that it does not provide true binocular depth perception; it is not suitable for print media, being limited to displays that can alternate between the two images, and it is difficult to appreciate details in images that are constantly in motion.

Number and timing of images 
Most wiggle images use only two images, yielding a jerky image. A smoother image can be composed by using several intermediate images and using the left and right images as end images of the image sequence. If intermediate images are not available, approximate images can be computed from the end images using techniques known as view interpolation. The two end images may be displayed for a longer time than the intermediate images to allow inspection of details in the left and right images.

Another option for reducing the impression of jerkiness is to reduce the time between the frames of a wiggle image.

3D photos from a single image 

With advances in machine learning and computer vision it is now also possible to recreate this effect using a single monocular image as an input. 

In this case one can use a segmentation model combined with a depth estimation model to estimate information relating to the distance of the surfaces of objects in the scene from a given viewpoint for every pixel in that image (known as a depth map), and with that information you can then render that pixel data as if it were 3 dimensional to create a subtle 3D effect.

Perception 
The sense of depth from wiggle 3-D images is due to parallax and to changes to the occlusion of background objects.

Although wiggle stereoscopy permits the perception of stereoscopic images, it is not a "true" three-dimensional stereoscopic display format in the sense that wiggle stereoscopy does not present the eyes with their own separate view each.

The apparent stereo effect results from syncing the timing of the wiggle and the amount of parallax to the processing done by the visual cortex. Three or five images with good parallax may produce a better effect than simple left and right images.

Wiggling works for the same reason that a transitional pan (or tracking shot) in a film provides good depth information: the visual cortex is able to infer distance information from motion parallax, the relative speed of the perceived motion of different objects on the screen. Many small animals bob their heads to create motion parallax (wiggling) so they can better estimate distance prior to jumping.

Gallery

See also
 Kinetic depth effect

References

Further reading
 Scott B. Steinman, Barbara A. Steinman and Ralph Philip Garzia. (2000). Foundations of Binocular Vision: A Clinical perspective. McGraw-Hill Medical.

External links

 Stereo-animator at New York Public Library website
 Wigglegram Android application for Wigglegrams

3D imaging
Animation techniques
Optical illusions
Articles containing video clips
Stereoscopic photography